The Straits of Florida, Florida Straits, or Florida Strait is a strait located south-southeast of the North American mainland, generally accepted to be between the Gulf of Mexico and the Atlantic Ocean, and between the Florida Keys (U.S.) and Cuba. It is 93 mi (150 km) wide at the narrowest point between Key West and the Cuban shore, and has been sounded to a depth of 6,000 feet (1,800 m). The strait carries the Florida Current, the beginning of the Gulf Stream, from the Gulf of Mexico.

Oil and gas
Five wells were drilled in state waters south of the Florida Keys from 1947 to 1962.  Gulf Oil drilled three wells in federal waters south of the Florida Keys in 1960 and 1961.  All the wells were dry holes.

The boundary between the Exclusive Economic Zones of the US and Cuba is halfway between Cuba and Florida, as determined by the 1977 Cuba–United States Maritime Boundary Agreement.

Offshore Cuba
Cuba has three producing offshore oil fields within 5 km of its north coast opposite Florida.  The US Geological Survey estimates that the North Cuba Basin contains  of undiscovered petroleum liquids and 9.8 trillion cubic feet of natural gas, almost all in the offshore part of the basin.

The issue of allowing oil and gas exploration offshore Florida became a hotly contested topic in the 2008 US elections.  In a column published 5 June 2008, syndicated columnist George Will wrote that a Chinese oil company was then drilling in Cuban waters  from the Florida coast, a claim that was repeated by candidates in favor of offshore drilling.  In fact, no drilling was then taking place in that part of Cuban waters.

In 2004 the Spanish oil company Repsol drilled in deep Cuban waters between Cuba and the Florida Keys, and found an oil deposit; the deposit was judged noncommercial, and the hole was plugged. In October 2008, Cuba signed an agreement with the Brazilian state oil company Petrobras, which provides for Petrobras to drill for oil and gas in deep waters off the north shore of Cuba.  In July 2009, Cuba signed an agreement with the Russian government giving the Russian oil company Zarubezhneft oil exploration rights off the north shore of Cuba. By May 2011 Petrobas had withdrawn from the 2008 agreement due to poor prospects.

Offshore Bahamas
In 2009 the Falkland Islands-registered company Bharat Petroleum Company Ltd. and Norwegian company Statoil announced a joint venture to drill for oil in Bahamian waters north of Cuba and southeast of Florida. The government of the Bahamas has indicated that applications for offshore drilling are on hold pending negotiations with Cuba, the United States, and the Turks and Caicos Islands on the exact boundaries between their respective Exclusive Economic Zones.

Crossing 
The swim across the strait was performed by Australian Susie Maroney (with Shark cage diving) in 1997 and American Diana Nyad (without shark cage) in 2013.

See also

 Florida Straits, an action-adventure film starring Fred Ward.
 Cay Sal Bank

References

 
Bodies of water of Cuba
Bodies of water of the Bahamas
Florida
Bahamas–United States border
Cuba–United States border